¡Caramba! is an album by jazz trumpeter Lee Morgan, released on the Blue Note label in 1968. It features performances by Morgan, Bennie Maupin, Cedar Walton, Reggie Workman and Billy Higgins with arrangements by Cal Massey.

Reception 

The AllMusic review by Scott Yanow stated: "Although not essential, this CD is a welcome reissue."

Track listing 
All compositions by Lee Morgan, except as indicated.
 "Caramba" – 12:24
 "Suicide City" – 7:32
 "Cunning Lee" – 6:13
 "Soulita" – 6:03
 "Helen's Ritual" – 6:29
 "A Baby's Smile" (Massey) – 6:00 Bonus track on CD

Personnel 
 Lee Morgan – trumpet
 Bennie Maupin – tenor saxophone
 Cedar Walton – piano
 Reggie Workman – bass
 Billy Higgins – drums
 Cal Massey – arranger

Charts

References 

Hard bop albums
Lee Morgan albums
1968 albums
Blue Note Records albums
Albums produced by Francis Wolff
Albums recorded at Van Gelder Studio